See is an American science fiction drama television series produced for Apple TV+ and starring Jason Momoa and Alfre Woodard in leading roles. The series is set in a post-apocalyptic dystopia in the distant future where humanity's descendants have lost their sense of sight, and the ability to see is considered to be myth. The plot is set in motion by the birth of twin sighted children in a mountain tribe.

See was created by Steven Knight. Anders Engström directed a majority of the episodes. It also stars Sylvia Hoeks, Hera Hilmar, Christian Camargo, Archie Madekwe, Nesta Cooper, and Yadira Guevara-Prip. Executive producers include Knight, Law. 

The series premiered on November 1, 2019, with a second season premiering on August 27, 2021. The third and final season premiered on August 26, 2022 and concluded on October 14, 2022.

Premise
In the 21st century, a virus wiped out most of humanity. Fewer than two million people survived, and all their descendants have lost their sense of sight. See takes place several centuries later, by which time society has found new ways to socially interact, build, hunt, and survive without vision, albeit at a much lower economic level; humanity has returned to tribal hunter-gatherer and medieval-type societies. Knowledge of the old, sighted world has become lost or distorted; it is believed that materials such as metal, concrete, and plastic were created supernaturally by gods. The concept of vision has become a myth, and any mention of it is considered heresy.

See's action takes place in an area contested by two rivals: the Payan Kingdom (capital city: Kanzua) and the Trivantian Republic (capital city: Trivantes). In the mountains, a pregnant woman named Maghra seeks shelter with the Alkenny tribe. The Chief of the Alkenny, Baba Voss, who has been unable to father children, marries her and adopts her children. Their biological father, Jerlamarel, is wanted by the Queen of the Payan Kingdom for the heresy of being "sighted" (the natural ability to see). Word spreads of Jerlamarel siring children, prompting a witch hunt for Jerlamarel and his offspring. Baba Voss must protect both his family and his tribe against the Queen's army.

Locations 
Although filmed in Canadian provinces of British Columbia and Ontario, the plot takes place in what was Western Pennsylvania. Some key names and locations from the show — despite differences due to language change — can be identified:
 Source:
 Alkenny — Alleghany
 Kanzua — Kinzua Dam
 Pennsa — State College
 Trivantes — Pittsburgh

Cast and characters

Main
 Jason Momoa as Baba Voss, a fearless warrior and the leader of the Alkenny Tribe. He is the husband of Maghra, older brother of Edo Voss, and the adopted father of Kofun and Haniwa, children born with the now-dormant sense of sight. He places the safety of his family, friends, and tribe as a top priority to protect them from the Witchfinders. This was Jason Momoa's second lead television role (after starring in the Canadian series Frontier).
 Sylvia Hoeks as Queen Sibeth Kane, the ruler of the Payan Kingdom and Maghra's older sister. She exercises her power ruthlessly and murders anyone who spreads heresy about the sense of sight.
 Hera Hilmar as Maghra Kane, who joined the Alkenny Tribe as a stranger, soon marrying Baba Voss. She is the younger sister of Sibeth and the mother of Kofun and Haniwa. Fiercely protective of her family, Maghra will do whatever is necessary to keep them alive.
 Christian Camargo as Tamacti Jun, the royal tax collector and Witchfinder General of the Payan army. A brilliant and violent soldier, he is tasked with finding those with sight, specifically the children of Jerlamarel. 
 Archie Madekwe as Kofun, the son of Baba Voss and Maghra, and the biological son of Jerlamarel, who has the ability to see. Composed, careful and intelligent, he grows to be more cautious than his twin sister Haniwa. 
 Nesta Cooper as Haniwa, the daughter of Baba Voss and Maghra, and the biological daughter of Jerlamarel, who also has the ability to see. Proud, determined, and strong, she grows to be more rebellious than her twin brother Kofun, and more curious about their true origins.
 Yadira Guevara-Prip as Bow Lion (season 1; guest seasons 2–3), a fierce ally of Baba Voss and a member of the Alkenny Tribe. She is the daughter of The Dreamer and possesses the skills of a "Shadow Warrior", having the rare ability to move undetected by sound or smell.
 Alfre Woodard as Paris (seasons 1–2), a wise elder member of the Alkenny Tribe. Her innate wisdom guides Baba Voss, especially in times of crisis, and she acts as a mother figure to him. She also serves as the shaman of the tribe.
 Eden Epstein as Wren (seasons 2–3), a smart and ambitious lieutenant, later captain, of the Trivantian army, who has the ability to see and is a close confidant of Edo Voss.
 Olivia Cheng as Charlotte (seasons 2–3), a fierce warrior from The Compass, a tribe tasked with protecting sighted children. She has no filter and is not shy about saying whatever is on her mind.
 Hoon Lee as Toad (season 2), a skilled Witchfinder soldier. He believes sight is evil, which has been ingrained in him since birth.
 Tom Mison as Lord Harlan (seasons 2–3), the fast talking, smart, and cunning ruler of the city of Pennsa. He is the older brother of Kerrigan and a childhood friend of Maghra.
 Dave Bautista as Edo Voss (season 2), the vengeful younger brother of Baba Voss and the Commander General of the Trivantian army, the rival kingdom of Payan.
 David Hewlett as Tormada (season 3; guest season 2), the chief science officer of the Trivantian army who develops a new and devastating form of sighted weaponry.
 Michael Raymond-James as Ranger (season 3), a childhood friend of Baba from Trivantes, now living as a nomad in the Northern Mountains.

Recurring
 Tantoo Cardinal as The Dreamer (season 1), an elder member of the Alkenny Tribe and the mother of Bow Lion.
 Mojean Aria as Gether Bax (season 1), an untrustworthy member of the Alkenny Tribe and the nephew of Souter Bax.
 Marilee Talkington as Souter Bax (season 1), a member of the Alkenny Tribe and the aunt of Gether Bax.
 Bree Klauser as Matal (season 1), a member of the Alkenny Tribe and a "Presage", someone with an extrasensory ability to feel emotions.
 Luc Roderique as Arca (season 1), the quartermaster of the Alkenny Tribe. Arca is loyal to Baba Voss.
 Peter James Bryant as Lord Dune (season 1), one of Sibeth Kane's advisors and a member of the ruling council of Payan.
 Hiro Kanagawa as Lord Unoa (season 1), the royal physician of Payan.
 Lauren Glazier as Nyrie (season 1), the loyal lady-in-waiting of Sibeth Kane.
 Franz Drameh as Boots (season 1; guest season 2), a mysterious former member of a scavenger tribe. He is also a son of Jerlamarel and has the ability to see.
 Timothy Webber as Cutter (season 1), a slave owner who controls a silk manufacturing operation that supplies the nobles of Payan.
 Jessica Harper as Cora (season 1; guest season 2), a slave who worked at Cutter's silk farms, until she later gains her freedom.
 Dayo Okeniyi as Oloman (season 2; guest seasons 1, 3), the oldest of Jerlamarel's sighted children and his right hand. He is also a proficient engineer.
 Alex Breaux as Dax (season 2), a Witchfinder serving under Toad.
 Adam Morse as Frye (season 2), a Witchfinder serving under Toad.
 Luke Humphrey as Kerrigan (season 2), Lord Harlan's younger brother and close advisor.
 Martin Roach as Captain Gosset (seasons 2–3), the commander of the military forces in Pennsa.
 Nina Kiri as Harmony (season 2; guest season 3), a servant in Pennsa who attends to both Sibeth & Maghra Kane.
 Adrian Groulx as Rockwell (season 2), a young child of Jerlamarel who was gifted to Edo Voss so he can take advantage of sight in combat.
 Joe Flanigan as The Military (season 2; guest season 3), a member of the triumvirate that rules The Trivantians who commands the army.
 Mainei Kinimaka as Belu (season 3; guest season 1), also known as Lu, she is a member of the Alkenny Tribe and a "Kill Dancer", an expert martial artist.
 Tamara Tunie as Nevla/ The Bank (season 3; guest season 2), a member of the triumvirate that rules The Trivantians who controls the finances and economics.
 Dean Jagger as Lucien Bray (season 3), a former Witchfinder with a strong hatred of the sighted who openly rebels against his Queen.
 Trieste Kelly Dunn as Ambassador Trovere (season 3), the new representative of The Trivantians, replacing Scopus, and a former lover of Lord Harlan.
 Murry Peeters as Shiloh (season 3), a former Witchfinder and Lucien's second-in-command. 
 Matthew G. Taylor as Lieutenant Maddox (season 3), a high-ranking soldier in the Trivantian army who is loyal to Tormada.

Guest
 Sharon Taylor as Ilun (season 1), a member of the Alkenny Tribe and a "Ayura", someone with an enhanced sense of hearing.
 Brianna Clark as Sinjay (season 1), a member of the Alkenny Tribe and a midwife who helps Maghra give birth.
 Joshua Henry as Jerlamarel (seasons 1–2), a heretic and preacher of sight. He is the biological father of Kofun, Haniwa, Boots, and many other sighted children.
 Aleks Paunovic as Wech (season 1), a notorious slaver who preys upon vulnerable tribes.
 Gabrielle Rose as Lady An (season 1), one of Sibeth Kane's advisors and a member of the ruling council of Payan.
 Kyra Zagorsky as Delia (season 1), a former lover of Jerlamarel and Boot's mother.
 Damaris Lewis as Sheva, one of Jerlamarel's sighted children who acts as his advisor.
 Raven Scott as Nonni (seasons 1, 3), one of Jerlamarel's sighted children. 
 Eddie McGee as Yakis (season 2), a blacksmith working in Trivantes and an old friend of Baba Voss.
 James Immekus as The People (seasons 2–3), a member of the triumvirate that rules The Trivantians who speaks for the civilians of the capital city, Trivantes.
 David Eisner as Ambassador Scopus (season 2), the representative of The Trivantians.

Episodes

Season 1 (2019)

Season 2 (2021)

Season 3 (2022)

Production

Development
On January 10, 2018, it was announced that Apple had given the production a series order for a single eight-episode season. The series was written by Steven Knight and directed by Francis Lawrence, both of whom also executive produced alongside Peter Chernin, Jenno Topping, and Kristen Campo. Production companies involved with the series consisted of Chernin Entertainment and Endeavor Content.

Lawrence, Knight, the show's writers, and the art and prop departments worked with blindness consultants, an evolutionary biologist, and a survivalist on worldbuilding See, brainstorming about how societies would develop and function under such conditions.

On November 7, 2019, Apple ordered a second season of the series. In June 2021, Apple announced the show was to be renewed for a third season.In June 2022, it was announced that the third season consisting of eight episodes would conclude the series. The final season premiered on August 26, 2022 and concluded on October 14, 2022.

Casting/preproduction
A July 2018 announcement revealed that Jason Momoa and Alfre Woodard had been cast in series regular roles, followed by news that Yadira Guevara-Prip, Nesta Cooper, Sylvia Hoeks, and Archie Madekwe had joined the main cast a month later. On October 18, 2018, it was reported that Christian Camargo and Hera Hilmar had been cast in series regular roles. 

Before filming began, the cast — which mostly consisted of sighted actors — underwent a month of rigorous "blindness training" with blindness coach Joe Strechay. The actors — sometimes wearing sleep shades — learning how to move sightlessly and to develop their other senses, including the rudimentary ability to echolocate. The goal was to also avoid the usual media clichés of blindness, such as characters constantly feeling each other's faces. The actors were also trained by movement director Paradox Pollack.

A few blind and low-sighted actors were cast in supporting roles, including Bree Klauser and Marilee Talkington, with the goal to increase that number in later seasons. Blind actor Adam Morse had a small role in season 2 as Frye, a Witchfinder serving under the character Toad.

Oliver Rae Aleron and Spencer Prewett from Archspire appear in a cameo in the first episode.

In January 2020, it was announced that Dave Bautista would be joining the series for season 2, playing the brother of Baba Voss. In February 2020, news followed that Adrian Paul would also be joining the cast, playing a character named Lord Harlan, though Tom Mison would end up taking that role. In October 2020, it was announced that Jason Momoa's former Stargate Atlantis castmate, Joe Flanigan, had been cast in the second season of the show in a recurring role. In June 2021, it was announced Eden Epstein, Tom Mison, Hoon Lee and Olivia Cheng had joined Bautista as new series regulars for the second season whilst David Hewlett and Tamara Tunie would guest star.

In June 2022, it was announced that David Hewlett, who guest starred in the second season, was promoted to series regular for the third and final season and was joined by new series regular Michael Raymond-James whilst Trieste Kelly Dunn would guest star.

Filming
Principal and major photography for the first season commenced on September 17, 2018, in Vancouver, British Columbia, Canada and ended on February 8, 2019. In October 2018, filming was reported to be taking place in Coquitlam, Eagle Mountain, North Vancouver (water shed), Rutheford service road, Pemberton, Deroche, Delta at Boundary Bay, Mission, Squamish Valley, Youth Detention Center Burnaby, Allouette in Mapleridge and the Campbell River and Strathcona Provincial Park areas of Vancouver Island, British Columbia. Production costs for See rivaled that of HBO's Game of Thrones, though rumors that the budget for the first two seasons was $240 million, or $15 million per episode, were debunked by Lawrence.

Filming for the second season was expected to begin on February 3, 2020, and end on July 10, 2020. However, in March 2020, production was shut down due to the COVID-19 pandemic. In September 2020, it was reported that See would resume filming on October 14, 2020, in Toronto. The second season finished filming on March 18, 2021.

Prior to the premiere of season two, the show was renewed for a third season with filming beginning in May and wrapping in November 2021.

Release
During Apple WWDC 2021, a sizzle reel included footage from the second season. A few days later, on June 10, 2021, a teaser for the second season was revealed along with the release of August 27, 2021.

Reception

Critical response 
The review aggregation website Rotten Tomatoes gave the first season a 44% approval rating based on 52 reviews, with an average rating of 5.30/10. The website's critical consensus reads, "Though its capable cast is clearly game, an over-reliance on gore and a grimly—and at times comically—convoluted narrative blurs Sees bold vision." On Metacritic the series has a weighted average score of 40 out of 100 based on reviews from 25 critics, indicating "generally unfavorable reviews". 

In November 2019, Variety'''s Daniel D'Addario was critical of the show, saying it: "Wastes the time of Jason Momoa and Alfre Woodard, among others, on a story that starts from a position of fun, giddy strangeness and drags itself forward at a lugubrious pace."

Ben Travers at IndieWire responded positively to the first season: "Steven Knight's action-drama is a strange-but-effective blend" and "the balance isn't quite there yet, as episodes don't exactly earn their hourlong run time. Momoa, meanwhile, fits the role well."

Rotten Tomatoes gave the second season an 83% approval rating based on 6 reviews, with an average rating of 7.10/10. Season 2 broke the viewership record for Apple TV, becoming the channel's most-watched drama series.Collider'', in reviewing the final season, wrote, "Season 3, which also serves as the conclusion of the show, continues this positive trajectory, arriving at an ending that offers plenty of well-staged action that also delves deeper into the characters nearing the end of their story."

Accolades

References

External links
  – official site
 
 "Map of Real World Locations in SEE on Apple TV+", PostApocalypticMedia.com
 "Where was See filmed? Guide to ALL the Filming Locations," AtlasOfWonders.com

2019 American television series debuts
2022 American television series endings
2010s American drama television series
2010s American science fiction television series
2020s American drama television series
2020s American science fiction television series
Dystopian television series
English-language television shows
Apple TV+ original programming
Television shows about blind people
Television series about viral outbreaks
Television series set in the 26th century
Television shows set in Pennsylvania
Television shows filmed in Vancouver
Post-apocalyptic television series
Television series created by Steven Knight
Television productions suspended due to the COVID-19 pandemic
Television series by Chernin Entertainment